Pindos or Pindus is the largest mountain range in Greece, extending to southern Albania.

Pindos or Pindus can also refer to:
 from the mountain range :
 Pindos Pony
 Pindos (municipality), in Thessaly
 Pindus (city), an ancient city in Doris, Greece
 Pindos or Pindus, the ancient name of river Kanianitis in Doris, Greece
Principality of the Pindus, an attempt to create an autonomous entity for the Aromanian population of Samarina and other villages of the Pindus mountains of Northern Greece
 Pindus (mythology), a character in Greek mythology
 Greek destroyer Pindos, World War II-era warship
 Pindos is a derogatory nickname for a citizen or inhabitant of the United States ("Pindostan")